Rhabdodiscus isidiatus is a species of corticolous lichen in the family Graphidaceae. Found in Sri Lanka, it was formally described as a new species in 2014 by lichenologists Gothamie Weerakoon, Robert Lücking, and Helge Thorsten Lumbsch. The lichen is only known to occur at the type locality, which is a patch of mid-elevation, disturbed montane forest. The specific epithet isidiatus refers to the presence of isidia on the thallus. The ascomata are rounded and prominent, measuring 0.7–1.0 mm in diameter with a 0.3–0.5 mm wide pore and a light brown rim. Its ascospores are hyaline, ellipsoid in shape, contain three thick septa, and measure 12–15 by 5–6 μm. Secondary chemicals present in the lichen include psoromic acid, subpsoromic acid, and 2'-O-demethylpsoromic acid.

References

Graphidaceae
Lichen species
Lichens of Sri Lanka
Lichens described in 2014
Taxa named by Helge Thorsten Lumbsch
Taxa named by Robert Lücking
Taxa named by Gothamie Weerakoon